1962 My Country Land is an English language film directed and written by filmmaker Chow Partha Borgohain in 2016 and produced by Living Dreams Films Productions. The film is about the border dispute, how two nations consider reconciliation based on the 1962 Sino-Indo war.

Plot 
At the Himalayan frontiers between India and Tibet, three people engage in combat over a plot of land that is neither in China nor India. Their lives are permanently altered by the 1962 outbreak of the Indo-Sino War. Love blossoms between two, but fate separates them. The other makes a sacrifice for the two by turning against his country.

Cast 

 Daniel Shin Han as Wong
 Aham Sharma as Army Lance Naik Luitya
 Lhakpa Lepcha
 Ketholeno Kense

Production 
1962 My Country Land is an Indian film production. It has been made by Living Dreams Productions in Arunachal Pradesh, India.

Awards

Reception 

 The depiction of the 1962 Indo-China War and rural life in the extraordinarily harsh terrain of Arunachal Pradesh would heighten the already strong sense of patriotism among the locals and also highlight the ongoing difficulty of resolving border disputes.

References

External links 

 
 

2016 films
Indian drama films
Films shot in Arunachal Pradesh
Films shot in Meghalaya
2010s Indian films